Christina Irene Aicardi Cagigao (born 14 January 1986) is a Peruvian badminton player. She competed at the 2007 and 2011 Pan American Games. In 2008, she won the gold medal at the Pan Am Championships in the women doubles partnered with Claudia Rivero. She played at the 2005 World Badminton Championships in Anaheim. In the women's singles event she lost in the first round to Elena Nozdran of Ukraine.

Achievements

Pan Am Championships
Women's singles

Women's doubles

South American Games
Women's singles

Women's doubles

BWF International Challenge/Series
Women's singles

Women's doubles

Mixed doubles

 BWF International Challenge tournament
 BWF International Series tournament
 BWF Future Series tournament

References

External links 
 

1986 births
Living people
Peruvian female badminton players
Peruvian people of Italian descent
Pan American Games competitors for Peru
Badminton players at the 2007 Pan American Games
Badminton players at the 2011 Pan American Games
South American Games gold medalists for Peru
South American Games silver medalists for Peru
South American Games medalists in badminton
Competitors at the 2010 South American Games
21st-century Peruvian women